Operation Sinai may refer to:

Sinai and Palestine campaign, during WWI
Operation Kadesh, an Israeli military operation in the Sinai Peninsula during the Suez Crisis in 1956
Operation Sinai (2012), an ongoing Egyptian military campaign, launched since early August 2012, against Islamic militants within the Sinai Peninsula to crush the Sinai Insurgency
Comprehensive Operation – Sinai 2018, code name of a large counter-terrorism campaign conducted by the Egyptian Armed Forces and the Interior Ministry